Järntorget (Swedish: "Iron Square") is a common name for public squares in Swedish cities, the two most well-known being:
 Järntorget (Stockholm)
 Järntorget (Göteborg)